Archeon can refer to:

An organism belong to the domain archaea.
Archeon, Netherlands, a Dutch archeological theme park in Alphen aan den Rijn
Made of Hate, a Polish melodic death metal band (transformed from the band Archeon).